The white-winged woodpecker (Dendrocopos leucopterus) is a species of bird in the family Picidae.
It is found in Afghanistan, China, Iran, Kazakhstan, Kyrgyzstan, Tajikistan, Turkmenistan, Uzbekistan. The white-winged woodpecker's natural habitats are temperate forests and subtropical or tropical moist lowland forests.

References

white-winged woodpecker
Birds of Central Asia
Birds of Afghanistan
white-winged woodpecker
Taxonomy articles created by Polbot